The Jorge Basadre Grohmann National University is a public university located in the city of Tacna, Peru. It was founded by Decree Law No. 1894 on August 26, 1971; academic activities started on May 13, 1972. The university is named after Jorge Basadre, a renowned Peruvian historian born in Tacna. Currently, the university is known by the acronym UNJBG and prepares students for 30 careers.

Faculties 
 Mining Engineering
 Accounting Sciences
 Metallurgical Engineering
 Administrative Sciences
 Fishing Engineering
 Agricultural Sciences
 Food Industries
 Obstetrics
 Education Sciences
 Sciences (Academic professional schools of: Biology-Microbiology, Computers and Systems, Applied Physics and Chemical Engineering)
 Nursing
 Medical Sciences
 Literature and Judicial Sciences
 Architecture and Urbanism
 Engineering 
 School of postgraduate studies

Administrators

External links 
  Official website
Jorge Basadre Grohmann National University in Wikipedia en español

Educational institutions established in 1971
Universities in Peru